FPS may refer to:

Arts and entertainment 
 "F.P.S." (Law & Order: Criminal Intent), an episode of the TV show Law & Order: Criminal Intent
 FPS Magazine, a defunct magazine about animation
 The Fabulous Picture Show, a television show on Al Jazeera English
 Facepunch Studios, a British video game developer
 First-person shooter, a video game which focuses typically on shooting guns from a first-person perspective
 Five Point Someone, a novel by Chetan Bhagat
 Front Porch Step, American musician
 Funday PawPet Show, an Internet puppet show

Education 
 Fargo Public Schools, in North Dakota, United States
 Foundation Public School, in Pakistan
 French Pastry School, a cooking school in Chicago, Illinois, United States
 Future Problem Solvers, an educational competition

Financial 

Faster Payments Service, a British banking initiative
Faster Payment System, a Hong Kong payment system

Government and politics 
 Facilities Protection Service, of the Government of Iraq
 Federal Protective Service (Russia)
 Federal Protective Service (United States)
 Federal Public Service, of the Federal Government of Belgium
 Free Party Salzburg, a political party in Austria
 Freedom Party of South Tyrol, a defunct political party in Italy

Science and technology

Units of measure 
 Foot per second
 Foot-pound-second system
 Frames per second, the frequency (rate) at which consecutive images (frames) appear on a display

Computing
 FairPlay Streaming, a digital rights management technology by Apple
 Fast packet switching, in networks
 Fitness proportionate selection, a genetic operator used in genetic algorithms
 Floating Point Systems, a defunct American computer hardware company

Other uses in science and technology
 Fear potentiated startle,  a reflexive physiological reaction
 Fission power system
 Focal-plane shutter, in optical systems
 Forties pipeline system in the North Sea
 Frontal protection system, for vehicles
 Sn-glycerol-3-phosphate 2-alpha-galactosyltransferase, also known as floridoside-phosphate synthase

Sport
 FPS (ice hockey), a Finnish ice hockey team
 Frames per stop, a bowling industry term

Other uses 

 Fellow of the Pharmaceutical Society of Australia
 Finchley Progressive Synagogue

See also 
 FP (disambiguation)